My Dear Melancholy (stylized as My Dear Melancholy,) is the debut extended play by Canadian singer the Weeknd. It was released on March 30, 2018, through XO and Republic Records. Primarily produced by Frank Dukes, who serves as an executive producer alongside the Weeknd, it features contributions from Gesaffelstein, as well as Mike Will Made It, DaHeala, Skrillex and Daft Punk's Guy-Manuel de Homem-Christo, among others.

My Dear Melancholy is described as a return to the darker style of the Weeknd's earlier work, evident in Trilogy (2012) and Kiss Land (2013). The extended play was supported by the single, "Call Out My Name", which peaked at number four on the US Billboard Hot 100. It received generally favourable reviews and debuted at number one on the US Billboard 200.

Background and release
On March 3, 2018, American rapper Travis Scott teased a new project by the Weeknd on Twitter, referring to it as "scary", and comparing it to when he "first heard" his music. Later that month, the Weeknd suggested that he was in the finishing stages of completing a new project, sharing multiple silent videos on Instagram of a recording studio, with the caption "mastering". This followed several months of in-studio pictures shared on the platform.

On March 28, the Weeknd teased the release of a new project, posting a screenshot of a text-message conversation between creative director La Mar Taylor and himself, concerning whether or not they should "drop [a new project on] Friday". The next day he announced the project to be released that night, sharing its cover art and title. On February 22, he had previously shared an image of the EP's title written on a notepad.

Following the EP's release, vertically-orientated music videos for "Call Out My Name" and "Try Me" were released exclusively through Spotify.

Music and lyrics
The EP has been described as "darker" than the Weeknd's previous studio releases Beauty Behind the Madness and Starboy, and has been described as a return to his earlier work though with more electronic music based production with Israel Daramola from Spin describing it as him "returning to the darkened drug den sounds of his earlier work". My Dear Melancholy is characterized as an alternative R&B, R&B and electropop record with production credits from Skrillex and Guy-Manuel de Homem-Christo from Daft Punk. My Dear Melancholys only feature is techno artist Gesaffelstein who produced the tracks "I Was Never There" and "Hurt You".

Lyrically, My Dear Melancholy focuses on heartbreak and anger related to a breakup. The lyrics focus around the Weeknd's past relationships, mainly his highly publicized romances with model Bella Hadid and singer and actress Selena Gomez. The theme is a complete change from the Weeknd's past two projects which were pop-based and more mainstream. The Weeknd sings in relation to Gomez's kidney transplant operation and her relationship with Justin Bieber with CNN's Lisa Respers France labelling Gomez as the Weeknd's "muse". The Weeknd reworks Gomez's lyrics from the song "Same Old Love" on the song "Wasted Times" in a way that Billboard described as "tormenting".

Critical reception

My Dear Melancholy was met with generally favourable reviews. At Metacritic, which assigns a normalized rating out of 100 to reviews from professional publications, the album received an average score of 63, based on 16 reviews. Aggregator AnyDecentMusic? gave it 5.7 out of 10, based on their assessment of the critical consensus.

Alex Petridis of The Guardian stated that My Dear Melancholy "abandons the pick'n'mix and indeed hit-and-miss approach of previous album Starboy in favour of something more cohesive: uniformly downbeat and twilit, it flows really well", but criticized its lyrical content. In a positive review, Ryan B. Patrick of Exclaim! commented that the project serves "as a soft reset of sorts, a musical palette cleanser that takes stock of what the Weeknd has accomplished thus far". For NME, Jordan Bassett called the album "thrilling", praising its tight and concise nature and "notable moments of stylistic brilliance" evident in Gesaffelstein's contributions, however criticizing its lack of character, noting that the Weeknd's predictability has led to his "impact [becoming] increasingly scattershot". Online publication HipHopDX commented that the EP "doesn't break any new ground, and — as he's done in the past — revisits elements of previous projects. However, without the bloated tracklist of Starboy, and any attempt to please an audience outside of his core, the lack of innovation doesn't seem take away from the concise, focused, conceptual nature of this well-produced R&B gem".

In a mixed review for Pitchfork, Larry Fitzmaurice wrote that the project "finds him in limbo between the bleary-eyed vibe of his early mixtapes and the bulletproof pop stylings of his last two albums", praising the album's production and "Tesfaye's still-sharp ear for cool, contemporary sounds", but criticizing similarities to his earlier work – specifically between "Call Out My Name" and "Earned It", as well as "Hurt You" and "I Feel It Coming" – and concluding that "it's too early in this stage of Tesfaye's career to so obviously attempt to replicate past glories". Israel Daramola of Spin criticized the album's lyrics as "mopey" and "whiny", and its production as "endlessly sludgy and murky", writing that the album "is incredibly self-involved and self-pitying, nothing but surface-level introspection that shows a lot of emotion but none of it in the service of anything but the singer's ego".

Year-end lists

Industry awards

Commercial performance
My Dear Melancholy was streamed more than 26 million times on its first day of release on Apple Music, double the amount of streams that were obtained on Spotify according to Republic Records, though Spotify claims that My Dear Melancholy was able to rake up 29 million streams in 24 hours. The EP was projected to move between 165,000-180,000 album-equivalent units first week and eventually moved 169,000 album-equivalent units with 68,000 being pure sales, hitting number one on the US Billboard 200. My Dear Melancholy was also the shortest album, by track count, to top the Billboard 200 in eight years, a feat previously done by Glee: The Music, Journey to Regionals. As of July 2018, it has sold 117,000 copies in the US.

Track listing

Notes
  signifies a co-producer

Personnel
Credits adapted from Tidal.

 DaHeala – keyboards, programming 
 Shin Kamiyama – engineering 
 Florian Lagatta – engineering 
 Jaycen Joshua – mixing 
 Skrillex – mixing 
 Tom Norris – mixing 
 David Nakaji – mixing assistance  
 Maddox Chhim – mixing assistance 
 Ben Milchev – mixing assistance 
 Chris Athens – mastering

Charts

Weekly charts

Year-end charts

Certifications

References

2018 debut EPs
The Weeknd albums
Albums produced by Frank Dukes
Albums produced by Mike Will Made It
Albums produced by Guy-Manuel de Homem-Christo
Albums produced by Cirkut
Albums produced by Gesaffelstein
Electropop EPs
Contemporary R&B EPs